Topham is a small rural hamlet upon the River Went in rural Yorkshire within the Metropolitan Borough of Doncaster in northern England. The hamlet runs along the Trans-Pennine Trail.

Geography
Topham is a rural hamlet on the River Went, a tributary of the River Don; alongside a dismantled railway. Also, because of its situation on the river; it is liable to flooding. The area around Topham is extremely flat with very few hills or inclines.

Overview
The hamlet includes the main structure of an early nineteenth century tower mill, which is now part of a house. The track to Balne Lodge and Balne Hall crosses the River Went at Topham Ferry bridge, a single-arched brick structure built in the early nineteenth century and little altered, although in poor condition.

References

Geography of the Metropolitan Borough of Doncaster
Hamlets in South Yorkshire